Hassan Dilunga (born 20 October 1993) is a Tanzanian footballer who plays as a forward for Simba and the Tanzania national football team.

Career
Dilunga moved from  Ruvu Shooting to Young Africans in 2013.

Dilunga transferred from Mtibwa Sugar to Simba Sports Club in 2018. Shortly after joining Simba, he scored the winning goal against his former side to win the Tanzanian Community Shield.

In 2019, Dilunga played in both legs of the Tanzania national team's playoff win against Burundi in the CAF First Round of 2022 FIFA World Cup qualification.

References 

1993 births
Living people
Tanzanian footballers
Association football forwards
Tanzania international footballers
Tanzanian Premier League players
Ruvu Shooting F.C. players
Young Africans S.C. players
Mtibwa Sugar F.C. players
Simba S.C. players